John Frederick "Frank" Taylor, OBE (7 December 1920 – 19 July 2002) was an English sports journalist and President of AIPS in 1973–1977 and 1981-1993. He was also President and former of UEPS – biggest continental section of AIPS.

Early life
Born in 1920 in Barrow-in-Furness, Lancashire, Taylor was the son of a shipyard engineer father, and went to Barrow Grammar School. He fought in the Second World War as a volunteer with the Royal Air Force. Taylor during his early days was involved in athletics, when he retired, Taylor later became a sports journalist.

Journalism
Taylor had first journalists experience in 1938 at the Barrow Guardian. Demobilisation in 1946 was followed by work for the North-West Evening Mail in Barrow, and the Sheffield Telegraph. At the end of 1950, he joined the News Chronicle (1953–61).  On 6 February 1958 Taylor was travelling with the Manchester United team and was the only sports journalist to survive the Munich air disaster. Later he was writing in the London's newspapers Daily Mail, the Daily Herald and The Sun.

Frank Taylor was sports columnist for the Daily Mirror (1961–85), one of the most widely read newspapers in Europe. He had taken part uninterruptedly in the Olympic Games from 1960 in Rome to 1992 in Barcelona.

His career culminated in him becoming president of the Association Internationale de la Presse Sportive (AIPS), the world association of sports writers, in 1973 when at the 37th Congress in London Félix Lévitan and Antoine Herbauts passed over the leadership to Great Britain, Frank Taylor as president, Bobby Naidoo general secretary. In the 1977 the UESP (AIPS – Europe biggest continent section of AIPS) has been founded after his suggestion.

Frank Taylor's outstanding personality and the energy of Massimo Della Pergola in 1981–1993 years were to give AIPS the powerful image and prestige which exists at all levels to this current day.

Family life
Taylor died of cancer in London in 2002 aged 81. He is survived by his wife Peggy and two journalist sons, Andrew MacDonald, of the Financial Times, and Alastair, of The Sun.

Awards and honours
Frank Taylor was appointed an Officer of the Order of the British Empire (OBE) in 1978 for services to sport and sport journalism.

The Queen's Silver Jubilee Medal.

Honorary member of the British Sports Writers' Association.

Memory 
The European Sportsman and Sportswoman of the Year Award was named the Frank Taylor Trophy since 2003 in honour of the former president of both AIPS and UEPS.

References

Bibliography
 Frank Taylor The Day a Team Died. – Ed. Souvenir Press Limited, 2012. – 194 p. 
 Matt – United – and Me by Murphy, Jimmy as told to Frank Taylor. – London: Souvenir Press, 1968. – First Edition. – 186 p. 
 Taylor, Frank Association football (Handbooks for sportsmen). – Publisher: FOYLE (January 1, 1964). – 90 p. – ASIN B0000CM9ZK
 Taylor, Frank OBE at al (2001) [1998]. The Official Manchester United Illustrated Encyclopedia (3rd ed.). London: Manchester United Books.

External links
 AIPS History (1924-2014)
 AIPS 2012 Congress Website
 Obituary: The Herald, July 23, 2002
 Dødsfald Tirsdag d. 23. juli 2002

1920 births
2002 deaths
People from Barrow-in-Furness
English male journalists
English sports journalists
Officers of the Order of the British Empire